The 2010 American National Rugby League season was the 13th season of the AMNRL. The Pittsburgh Vipers are the newest team to enter the competition and the Bucks County Sharks have withdrawn from the competition.

Teams
 Some teams will also field a 2nd team which will be played after the main game in order to give players more experience.
 The Canada national rugby league team has been invited to play in the War at the Shore only and will not feature in the regular season competition with the game set to be re-launched in Canada after years of inactivity
 A Chicago-based team (The Chicago Stockyarders) will also play in the War at the Shore with future plans to enter into the AMNRL.

Season
The competition starts June 5 and finishes August 28. Below indicates the Rounds and the matches.

Round 1
Week of June 5

 Northern Raiders (Bye)

Round 2
Week of June 12

 Connecticut Wildcats (Bye)

Round 3
Week of June 19

 Jacksonville Axemen (Bye)

Round 4
Week of June 26

 Philadelphia Fight (Bye)
 Fairfax Eagles (Bye)
 New York Knights (Bye)

Weekend of July 4
 Open for holiday and potential makeup date

Round 5
Week of July 10

 Washington DC Slayers (Bye)
 Boston 13s (Bye)
 New Haven Warriors (Bye)

Round 6
Week of July 17

 Aston Bulls (Bye)

Round 7
Week of July 24

 New York faced Bucks County Sharks in the Washington Crossing Challenge replacement game New York defeated Bucks County 46-12.
 Pittsburgh Vipers (bye)

War at the Shore
Week of July 31
Robert Preston Memorial Rugby League Challenge Cup
The new look War at the Shore event has been won by the DC Internationals, a select side from Washington.

The Internationals beat the New York Knights 10-0 in the championship final Saturday evening in Sea Isle City, NJ.

The American National Rugby League's showpiece event had a vastly different look about it this year with teams playing abbreviated games as part of a festival-like set up.

The New York Knights, Aston Bulls, Philadelphia Fight, Boston 13s and Connecticut Wildcats of the AMNRL were joined by select sides from Washington DC and New England, as well as a Canadian representative team.

The DC Internationals were a combination of the Washington DC Slayers and Fairfax Eagles, while the New England Immortals were composed of players from the 13s, Wildcats and New Haven Warriors. The Canadian Mounties represented teams north of the border.

Matches in the championship bracket consisted of two 15-minutes halves and games in the elimination bracket were 10-minute halves.

In excess of 2000 people were attracted to the event. There were fan activities all day long, plus music, prizes and giveaways to keep spectators entertained.

In the championship final, the Internationals scored two tries and kept their own line intact in a decider that was very much a back and forth contest.

The Knights opened the match in solid fashion by controlling the ball, but they couldn't crack the opposition's line. After absorbing the early pressure, the Internationals got the opening score when Tom O'Connor (DC Slayers) kicked ahead on the last tackle, regathered the ball and went in for the try.

The teams went to the interval with the Internationals leading 4-0. The second frame was much the same with both sides threatening to score, both putting up goal line stands and both being held up over the line.

As time was about to expire, Michael Chapman (DC Slayers) sealed the deal with a try for the Internationals. It was converted by Reece Blayney (Fairfax Eagles) and the 'Robert Preston Memorial Rugby League Challenge Cup' was won for the very first time.

John Young (Fairfax Eagles) was named War at the Shore MVP. Young scored several tries and had a stellar day.

"It was the Australians who helped us win. They played their brand of rugby from back home," Internationals manager Rich Nolte told ARN.

"For the most part, the Americans on the team were in the forwards and they put in some excellent work, especially on defense."

From New York's standpoint mistakes at inopportune times proved costly.

"All in all it was an exciting game," said Knights CEO Rob Ballachandran.

"It was really good for us because we were able to get a lot of our young reserve guys into the mix and with the playoffs starting in a couple of weeks, the team bonding was important."

In the Rugby League Sevens Exhibition game, the Northern Raiders beat the Chicago Stockyarders select side 18-10.

Open Round
Week of August 31
 Team Preparations for Playoffs

Play-Offs
Weeks of August 14, 21, 28
 8 Teams Seeded according to points earned during regular season. Lowest seed always plays highest seed.

Round 1 (Play-Offs)
August 14

Round 2 (Play-Offs)

Grand final
Pre game matches:
 Red vs Blue (United States national rugby league team trial selection)
 Philadelphia Fight vs Chicago Stockyarders (7s exhibition game)
 Ladies Eagletag

Notable Moments
April
 20th
 Former Parramatta Eels and St. George Illawarra Dragons NRL player Daniel Wagon arrived in the United States in May to play for the Aston Bulls.
June
 12th
 Former NRL players Tony Duggan and Jye Mullane signed with the New Haven Warriors after finishing stints in France.

Preseason

A preseason match between the Philadelphia Fight and the Fairfax Eagles was played at the Wachovia Center (the first time a rugby league game was played there) in front of 10,100 fans in a bid to increase awareness of rugby league in the United States and to help raise spectator numbers for the Philadelphia Wings lacrosse team. The score was a nil all draw.

Television
America One are currently showing National Rugby League matches from Australia and New Zealand as well as Super League matches from Europe. There are plans to show the AMNRL Grand Final on the America One channel as well as US Tomahawks (the United States national rugby league team) matches.
JAXAXE TV streams Jacksonville Axemen home games live on JAXAXE TV through their website.

Standings
Final standings (unofficial):

References

External links
 David Niu's(AMNRL President) Twitter
 AMNRL Website

American National Rugby League seasons
Amnrl Season, 2010
Amnrl Season, 2010